Thaisella tumulosa is a species of sea snail, a marine gastropod mollusk, in the family Muricidae, the murex snails or rock snails.

Distribution
This marine species ccurs off Japan.

References

 Houart, R. (2017). Description of eight new species and one new genus of Muricidae (Gastropoda) from the Indo-West Pacific. Novapex. 18 (4): 81-103

External links
 Reeve, L. A. (1846). Monograph of the genus Purpura. In: Conchologia iconica, or, illustrations of the shells of molluscous animals, Vol. 3. L. Reeve & Co., London. Pls. 1-13 and unpaginated text

tumulosa
Gastropods described in 1846